Tris(2,2,2-trifluoroethyl) borate, also commonly referred to as the Sheppard amidation reagent, is a chemical compound with the formula . This borate ester reagent is used in organic synthesis.

Preparation 

Tris(2,2,2-trifluoroethyl) borate can be prepared by reaction of trifluoroethanol with boron trichloride, borane dimethylsulfide, boron tribromide, or boric anhydride. The latter is more convenient for larger scale preparations due to its low cost and ease of handling.

The product is purified by distillation.

Applications 

The reagent is mostly used in condensation reactions. It has been shown to promote the direct formation of amides from carboxylic acids and amines as well as the formation of imines from amines or amides with carbonyl compounds.

It has also been used for the coupling of unprotected amino acids with amines.

It has also been shown to mediate formylation of amines, via transamidation of dimethylformamide.

It is a strong Lewis acid (acceptor number = 66, Gutmann-Beckett method).

References

Further reading
 Related reagent tris(2,2,2-trinitroethyl)borate: 

Borate esters
Organofluorides
Trifluoromethyl compounds